João Paulo Marques Silva is a Portuguese researcher working on SAT. He developed the SAT solver GRASP during his PhD.

Marques-Silva was a Senior Lecturer from October 2005 until June 2007 at the school of Electronics and Computer Science of the University of Southampton. In June 2007 he was promoted to Professor, the highest Professorship ranking in the UK.  Since 2009 he moved to University College Dublin, Ireland.

In the field of SAT he is seen as one of the most important researchers. His works ranges from SAT techniques and implementation to its applicability in Model Checking and biology. He has published over 50 papers.

Former students
 Huan Chen
 António Morgado
 Vasco Manquinho
 Inês Lynce

External links
 https://web.archive.org/web/20090327120917/http://www.csi.ucd.ie/staff/jpms/

Living people
Year of birth missing (living people)